Hybanthus stellarioides, commonly known as spade flower is an annual herb of the genus Hybanthus, native to Australia.

Description
The leaves are discolorous, recurved and can be entire or toothed.

Flowers are solitary with petals orange or yellow in colour. The prominent lower petal is spathulate. Flowering period is summer.

Taxonomy
Hybanthus stellarioides was described by K. Domin in 1928 as Hybanthus enneaspermus var. stellarioides, but in 1993 was named Hybanthus stellarioides by P.I. Forster.

Habitat and ecology

Hybanthus stellarioides is found in sandy areas in eucalypt dominated communities. It is widespread in New South Wales along the North coast and Central Coast. It is also found along the Queensland east coast.

See also
Hybanthus genus

References

stellarioides
Flora of New South Wales
Flora of Queensland
Taxa named by Karel Domin